Naqareh Khaneh or Neqareh Khaneh, also rendered as Naghareh Khaneh, may refer to:
 Neqareh Khaneh, Fars
 Neqareh Khaneh, Kohgiluyeh and Boyer-Ahmad
 Naqareh Khaneh-ye Filgah, Kohgiluyeh and Boyer-Ahmad Province
 Naqareh Khaneh, Razavi Khorasan